Freedom Township may refer to:

Arkansas
 Freedom Township, Polk County, Arkansas, in Polk County, Arkansas

Illinois
 Freedom Township, Carroll County, Illinois
 Freedom Township, LaSalle County, Illinois

Iowa
 Freedom Township, Hamilton County, Iowa
 Freedom Township, Palo Alto County, Iowa

Kansas
 Freedom Township, Bourbon County, Kansas
 Freedom Township, Ellis County, Kansas
 Freedom Township, Republic County, Kansas

Michigan
 Freedom Township, Michigan

Minnesota
 Freedom Township, Waseca County, Minnesota

Missouri
 Freedom Township, Lafayette County, Missouri

North Dakota
 Freedom Township, Ward County, North Dakota, in Ward County, North Dakota

Ohio
 Freedom Township, Henry County, Ohio
 Freedom Township, Portage County, Ohio
 Freedom Township, Wood County, Ohio

Pennsylvania
 Freedom Township, Adams County, Pennsylvania
 Freedom Township, Blair County, Pennsylvania

South Dakota
 Freedom Township, Faulk County, South Dakota, in Faulk County, South Dakota

Township name disambiguation pages